Birundeh (also Romanized as Bīrūndeh; also known as Berūndeh, Birundekh, Birundoh, and Borūndeh) is a village in Qareh Poshtelu-e Pain Rural District, Qareh Poshtelu District, Zanjan County, Zanjan Province, Iran. At the 2006 census, its population was 365, in 80 families.

References 

Populated places in Zanjan County